Chlöe Charlotte Swarbrick  (born 26 June 1994) is a New Zealand politician. Following a high-profile but unsuccessful run for the 2016 Auckland mayoral election, she became a parliamentary candidate for the Green Party of Aotearoa New Zealand, standing in the 2017 New Zealand general election and was elected as a member of the New Zealand Parliament at the age of 23. In the 2020 election, Swarbrick was elected as the Member of Parliament for Auckland Central, becoming the second Green Party MP to win an electorate seat in the history of the party, and only the second minor party MP since the inception of MMP to win a general electorate seat without a tacit endorsement from a major party leader.

Swarbrick is Green Party Spokesperson for Mental Health, Drug Law Reform, Education, Arts and Heritage, Tertiary Education, Small Business, Broadcasting, Youth and Local Government.

Early life
Swarbrick was born in Auckland in 1994 and went to Epsom Girls' Grammar School. Her parents separated when she was young and she lived with her mother in the UK for six months and then with her father for 18 months in Papua New Guinea. She said her father taught her how to formulate an argument when she was practising her first speech at age seven. During high school she spent a week at a time with each parent. She entered the University of Auckland at age 17, and graduated with a Bachelor of Laws and a Bachelor of Arts in Philosophy. She says she did not want to be a lawyer but wanted to learn more about the Treaty of Waitangi and the legal system.

Career
In 2012, Swarbrick opened her first business, a New Zealand-made fashion label called The Lucid Collective, with Alex Bartley Catt. Around the same time, she began working in the newsroom at the student radio station 95bFM as a news writer and newsreader, before becoming a producer and eventually host of The Wire. In April 2016, she resigned from her position as a regular host. The Lucid Collective is no longer in business.

In 2014, Swarbrick wrote her first piece for What's Good magazine. She became editor, and an owner. Later that year, The Lucid Collective held a New Zealand Fashion Week side-show at the Gow Langsford Gallery and participated in the "Youthquake" exhibition at the New Zealand Fashion Museum. The label went on to be stocked across Auckland, Wellington, and Christchurch, before Swarbrick and Bartley Catt closed the business.

Swarbrick launched The Goods, an offshoot of What's Good, in late 2015. The project opened a pop-up store in St Kevin's Arcade on Karangahape Road. Swarbrick won a New Zealander of the Year Local Hero Award.

In 2016, Swarbrick and Bartley Catt started a digital consultancy and artist management agency called TIPS. The pair also opened a cafe and gallery, Olly, now listed permanently closed, next to the Crystal Palace Theatre in Mount Eden.

In May 2019, Swarbrick received the Jane Goodall Trailblazer Award. The award recognises individuals who have demonstrated dedication to the prosperity of animals, people, or the planet through their work.

In 2020, Swarbrick was named to Fortune magazine's '40 Under 40' listing under the "Government and Politics" category.

In August 2020, a short documentary film named Ok Chlöe was released about the background of Swarbrick and her political career.

Political career

Swarbrick ran in the 2016 Auckland mayoral election, coming in third place, with 29,098 votes—almost 160,000 votes behind the winner, Phil Goff. In 2016 as a mayoral candidate, she gave a speech at a human blockade (organised by Auckland Peace Action) that briefly interrupted a New Zealand Defence Industry Association Forum.

Swarbrick said she entered the mayoral race as a form of protest after interviewing "uninspiring" potential candidates while working as a journalist for bFM and discovering that only 34% of the electorate had voted at the previous mayoral election. Swarbrick gained significant media attention largely due to her age. After losing the mayoral race, she joined the Green Party.

Soon after joining the Green Party, Swarbrick announced she would challenge sitting Green MP Denise Roche as the party's candidate in the Auckland Central electorate for the 2017 general election. Her challenge was unsuccessful, as the local branch selected Denise Roche to stand in the seat again. Swarbrick was selected instead to stand for the Maungakiekie electorate, and placed 7th  on the party list. At age 23 she was the youngest politician to enter Parliament in New Zealand since Marilyn Waring in 1975.

Parliamentary career

Election access 
After the 2017 general election, Swarbrick lodged the Election Access Fund Bill (a member's bill originally drafted by Mojo Mathers) in the member's ballot and in February 2018 this bill was drawn from the ballot. This piece of legislation aims to "establish an Election Access Fund to be administered by the Electoral Commission and used by any disabled candidate to cover disability-related costs of standing in a general election, by not-for-profit bodies to cover costs of making election education events and materials accessible, and by registered political parties to support access needs of any members to allow them to participate within the party." The Bill passed its first reading in May 2018 with unanimous support. It passed its second reading in December 2019, and its third reading in March 2020. The unanimous passing of the Bill is particularly significant, as it is the first Green Party Bill to achieve this.

Drug reform 

Swarbrick also inherited the Misuse of Drugs (Medicinal Cannabis and Other Matters) Amendment Bill from fellow Green Party MP Julie Anne Genter. Swarbrick gained endorsements from former Prime Minister Helen Clark and Grey Power for this piece of legislation. This Bill was however voted down in January 2018. Swarbrick has since negotiated changes to David Clark's Misuse of Drugs (Medicinal Cannabis) Amendment Act including the inclusion of local native strains of cannabis in New Zealand and a guarantee that the medicinal cannabis regulations this bill empowers be made public and functioning within a year. She is also a staunch campaigner for the legalisation of recreational cannabis.

Swarbrick took on the Green Party's Drug Law Reform portfolio in January 2018. In response to New Zealand's synthetics crisis and more than 50 associated deaths, Swarbrick launched a campaign for an end to the criminalisation of drug users and addicts. Within the government's Misuse of Drugs Amendment Bill, Swarbrick negotiated a formalisation of police discretion that requires police 'should not' prosecute unless it is in the public interest and the user would benefit from a therapeutic approach.

During 2018, Swarbrick worked with other MPs across parliament to form a Cross-Party Group on Drug Harm Reduction, she repeatedly called on the New Zealand National Party to join this group. In response to a call from National MP Matt Doocey for cross-party work on mental health, Swarbrick proposed creating a group merging the Cross-Party Group on Drug Harm Reduction and a mental health group, in August 2019, this group, the Cross-Party Group on Mental Health and Addictions was launched, with members from every party in Parliament.

From the starting point of a parliament disagreeing on how to implement medicinal cannabis, Swarbrick worked to establish a medicinal cannabis regulatory regime allowing local cannabis strains to be registered in New Zealand and removing barriers to legal and high-value careers for people with former cannabis convictions.

In 2018, Swarbrick launched the political podcast 'Authorised By' with Kiri Allan.

Following the release of the preliminary results for the 2020 New Zealand cannabis referendum (in which 53% voted against the proposed legalisation of cannabis), Swarbrick vowed to continue the fight for decriminalising cannabis. She criticised the "Say Nope to Dope" campaign for allegedly spreading misinformation and called on her fellow MPs to support drug reform.

Mental health 
Swarbrick fought to secure and retain security for community mental health services. In particular, she obtained extensions to funding for Te Whare Mahana Trust in Golden Bay and Te Kuwatawata in the Gisborne region.

Swarbrick also worked to establish and expand the Piki pilot programme, which provides young people aged 18–25 with free mental health support.

Climate emergency 
In May 2019 Swarbrick attempted to obtain unanimous leave to pass a motion to declare a climate change emergency. This was unsuccessful due to the National Party's opposition to it.

Fossil fuel divestment 
Swarbrick has advocated for a mandate requiring public funds to divest from fossil fuels. She secured a public briefing into ACC, which has nearly $1 billion invested into fossil fuels. Swarbrick has publicly challenged the Minister of Finance to use his discretion under the Crown Entities Act to take "action to prevent a climate crisis". Her Member's Bill which directs the Government to shift away from fossil fuel investment, currently sits in the ballot.

"OK boomer" 

In November 2019 Swarbrick responded to then opposition spokesperson for climate change Todd Muller with the phrase "OK boomer" after he interrupted her speech on climate change. Swarbrick was commenting on the Zero Carbon bill, which aims to reduce net carbon emissions in New Zealand to zero by 2050, when she used the phrase. Although there was little reaction to her comment in Parliament, her two-word throwaway remark became a talking point in media around the world. Writing in The Guardian, she said: "My 'OK boomer' comment in parliament was off-the-cuff, albeit symbolic of the collective exhaustion of multiple generations."

Education work 
During New Zealand's COVID-19 response, the government released a tertiary support package. This package was considered unhelpful by students and student associations. In addition, several university halls of residence continued to charge students who left their accommodation during the nation-wide lockdown, to isolate elsewhere. Swarbrick maintained her support of students and called for universities to "do the right thing" and stop these charges. Her attention to the issue has seen some universities delay these charges. Other universities have completely waived fees for unused accommodation.

Swarbrick's advocacy on behalf of students exposed a deeply underregulated sector. Swarbrick worked to obtain cross-party support to launch an Inquiry into student accommodation. Submissions for this opened on 4 June 2020.

2020 general election
During the 2020 New Zealand general election, Swarbrick contested and won the Auckland Central electorate, which had previously been held by retiring National MP Nikki Kaye. Swarbrick won Auckland Central with 12,631 votes, with Labour's Helen White coming second at 11,563 and National's Emma Mellow coming third at 9775. She became the second Green MP to have won an electorate in 21 years after former Greens Co-leader Jeanette Fitzsimons won Coromandel in 1999, and the second minor party MP since the introduction of MMP in 1996 to win a general electorate seat without a tacit endorsement from a major party leader, after Winston Peters in Tauranga and later Northland.

Housing
In mid-October 2020, Swarbrick made remarks suggesting that it could be a conflict of interest for MPs who own multiple houses to be making decisions that affect the housing market.

Alcohol advertising
In mid-May 2021, Swarbrick proposed a bill to ban alcohol advertising and sponsorship from sports. It would also abolish appeals against local authorities' alcohol regulation policies. On 30 June 2022, Swarbrick's Sale and Supply of Alcohol (Harm Minimisation) Amendment Bill was pulled from the member's bill ballot. Six local regional councils including the Auckland Council, Hamilton City Council, and Christchurch City Council have expressed support for Swarbrick's member's bill.

Personal life
On the topic of her sexuality, Swarbrick has said she "likes people", refusing to give a label. She says she did not come out of the closet because she was never in the closet, echoing the sentiment from a conversation she had with Scottish MP Mhairi Black. In January 2020 it was reported that Swarbrick had been engaged to Nadine Walker for several months, but that they had remained private about their relationship. Swarbrick has referred to herself as queer in the past.

Swarbrick is a vegan and advocates for a vegan lifestyle.

Swarbrick has dyscalculia and a history of depression and anxiety. Swarbrick sees a psychologist weekly and is on anti-depressants. In September 2021, Swarbrick revealed that she received an adult diagnosis of attention deficit hyperactivity disorder.

Public image

OK Chlöe

OK Chlöe is a short documentary film directed by Charlotte Evans and produced by Letisha Tate-Dunning. The film premiered online as part of the seventh season of "Loading Docs". The documentary is about the political career of Swarbrick. The title "OK Chlöe" is based on the saying "OK Boomer", which is a phrase that Swarbrick said during a parliamentary speech in reply to a heckle from a National Party MP. The reply became viral. The film is about the full story of Swarbrick as she goes into details about both her personal life and professional life as a politician. She talks about her work in legalising cannabis leading into the 2020 New Zealand cannabis referendum. It talks about how she feels being in the New Zealand Parliament, saying "Parliament is a toxic culture that chews people up and spits them out. You become inhuman and disconnected from the people you purport to represent." The film also talks about her background, from her personal life with her being adopted, struggles with mental health and coming out as bisexual, to her running for Auckland Mayor. After the release of the documentary, John Campbell questioned Chloe on some of the statements said on the documentary.

OK Chlöe was partly crowdfunded on Boosted.org.nz with a goal of $2,500, but reached $6,270 with 82 donors. Loading Docs received $195,342 of NZ On Air funding to produce 8 documentaries, which included OK Chlöe.

Being Chloe
In December 2021, NZ On Air and the New Zealand Film Commission allocated NZ$200,000 and NZ$20,000 to a feature-length documentary focusing on the political career of Swarbrick called Being Chloe. The documentary's producer is Letisha Tate-Dunning and would be filmed over the next two years. In mid-May 2022, the ACT party leader David Seymour and National Party leader Christopher Luxon criticised NZ On Air's decision to fund the documentary, claiming that it compromised the government funding agency's independence. In response to criticism, Swarbrick and Broadcasting Minister Kris Faafoi defended NZ On Air's decision to fund Being Chloe. Tate-Dunning also claimed that neither Swarbrick, the Green Party or NZ On Air had any editorial control over the documentary, which she stated would focus on Swarbrick balancing her political career with her priorities.

Views and positions

Homelessness
In July 2022, Swarbrick urged the Auckland Council to consider establishing a homeless hotline for homeless individuals following the death of a 72-year-old woman who had been staying in her car in Remuera.

Israel and Palestine
Swarbrick has expressed sympathy for the Palestinians. On 11 May 2021, she and 16 other New Zealand Members of Parliament donned keffiyeh to mark World Keffiyeh Day.

Notes

References

External links

 Official website
 
 Excerpt of Chlöe Swarbrick's Maiden Speech to Parliament

1994 births
Living people
21st-century New Zealand politicians
21st-century New Zealand women politicians
Candidates in the 2017 New Zealand general election
Green Party of Aotearoa New Zealand MPs
LGBT members of the Parliament of New Zealand
LGBT women
New Zealand cannabis activists
New Zealand list MPs
People educated at Epsom Girls' Grammar School
People from Auckland
University of Auckland alumni
Women members of the New Zealand House of Representatives
Candidates in the 2020 New Zealand general election
New Zealand MPs for Auckland electorates
21st-century New Zealand LGBT people